Kiryū or Kiryu may refer to:

People
Yoshihide Kiryū (born 1995), Japanese track and field sprinter
Kiryu Coco, a Japanese Virtual YouTuber formerly associated with hololive

Places
Kiryū, Gunma, a city in Gunma Prefecture, Japan

Fictional characters
Kazuma Kiryu, protagonist of the Yakuza video game series
Kiryu family, characters from the Fatal Frame / Project Zero video game series
Yūzuki Kiryū, a character in the Kissxsis manga and anime
Yoshiya Kiryū (also called Joshua), a character in the video game The World Ends with You
Mimori Kiryu, a character from s-CRY-ed
Zero and Ichiru Kiryu, characters from Vampire Knight
Kiryu, another name for the third Mechagodzilla character in the Japanese Godzilla franchise
Kiryu Kyosuke, or Kalin Kessler, a character from Yu-Gi-Oh! 5D's
Kiryū Moeka, a character from the visual novel Steins;Gate
Sento Kiryu, protagonist of the Kamen Rider Build
Wakatsu Kiryū, a character from Haikyuu!!

Other
Kiryū (己龍), a Japanese visual kei band
6275 Kiryu, an asteroid

Japanese-language surnames